The Serbia and Montenegro men's national basketball team also widely known as the FR Yugoslavia men's national basketball team, represented Serbia and Montenegro in international basketball competition, from 1993 to 2006. It was governed by the Basketball Federation of Serbia and Montenegro.

History
After the breakup of Yugoslavia, in 1991–1992, the original senior Yugoslavian national basketball team was dissolved. Bosnia and Herzegovina (Bosnian and Herzegovina NT), Croatia (Croatian NT), Macedonia (Macedonian NT) (later known as North Macedonia), and Slovenia (Slovenia) then formed their own senior national teams. While the then remaining and smaller Yugoslavia (originally known as FR Yugoslavia, and later as Serbia and Montenegro) formed its own senior national team.

That senior national team was originally named either "Yugoslavia national basketball team", or "FR Yugoslavia national basketball team", from 1992 until 2003, after the country's name at the time. In 2003, after the country was renamed from FR Yugoslavia to Serbia and Montenegro, the team was also renamed to "Serbia and Montenegro national basketball team". After Serbia and Montenegro split up, in 2006, and became the independent countries of Serbia and Montenegro, they each formed their own successor national teams. The senior Serbian national basketball team's first appearance at a major FIBA competition was at the 2007 EuroBasket. While the senior Montenegrin national basketball team's first appearance at a major FIBA event was at the 2011 EuroBasket.

Names
Federal Republic of Yugoslavia (FR Yugoslavia) national basketball team: 1992–2003
Serbia and Montenegro national basketball team: 2003–2006

Competitions

Olympic Games

FIBA World Cup

EuroBasket

Honours

Medals table

Individual awards
 FIBA World Cup MVP
 Dejan Bodiroga – 1998
 FIBA World Cup All-Tournament Team
 Dejan Bodiroga – 1998
 Željko Rebrača – 1998
 Predrag Stojaković – 2002
 EuroBasket MVP
 Aleksandar Đorđević – 1997
 Peja Stojaković – 2001
 EuroBasket All-Tournament Team
 Vlade Divac – 1995
 Aleksandar Đorđević – 1997
 Željko Rebrača – 1997
 Dejan Bodiroga – 1997, 1999
 Peja Stojaković – 2001

Rosters

1995 EuroBasket (as FR Yugoslavia)
1996 Summer Olympics (as FR Yugoslavia)
1997 EuroBasket (as FR Yugoslavia)
1998 FIBA World Cup (as FR Yugoslavia)
1999 EuroBasket (as FR Yugoslavia)
2000 Summer Olympics (as FR Yugoslavia)

2001 EuroBasket (as FR Yugoslavia)
2002 FIBA World Cup (as FR Yugoslavia)
2003 EuroBasket (as Serbia and Montenegro)
2004 Summer Olympics (as Serbia and Montenegro)
2005 EuroBasket (as Serbia and Montenegro)
2006 FIBA World Cup (as Serbia and Montenegro)

Head coaches

|}

Predecessor and successor teams
 (predecessor team)
 (continuity team)
 (successor team)

See also
Yugoslavia national basketball team
Serbia men's national basketball team
Montenegro men's national basketball team

References

Serbia & Montenegro fiba.com

External links
Serbia & Montenegro fiba.com

 
Basketball in Yugoslavia
FIBA EuroBasket-winning countries
Former national basketball teams
Basketball